Bashkim Dedja (born March 13, 1970) is the former head of the Constitutional Court of Albania.

References

Living people
21st-century Albanian judges
Constitutional Court of Albania
Place of birth missing (living people)
1970 births